"There's No One Quite Like Grandma" is a song by the Stockport-based primary school choir St Winifred's School Choir, released as a single in November 1980. It was number-one on the UK Singles Chart from 21 December 1980 to 3 January 1981. The song was written by Gordon Lorenz.

The song was the 1980 Christmas number-one single in both the UK and Ireland. In the UK, it demoted John Lennon's last single, "(Just Like) Starting Over", to number two. After two weeks at number one, a previous Lennon song, "Imagine", replaced it. This was a posthumous release as Lennon had been killed three weeks prior. Another song that "There's No One Quite Like Grandma" prevented from reaching number one was "Stop the Cavalry" by Jona Lewie, which has since become a Christmas favourite in the UK that finished at number three on the Christmas chart.

More recently, the song was used within the one-off Channel 4 comedy by Peter Kay called Britain's Got the Pop Factor..., which had Sally Lindsay, who was in the original choir of the song, in a cameo role. Furthermore, an extract of the song is always used in the "Granny Brainiac" segment in Series 3 of the Sky One TV show Brainiac: Science Abuse.

In October 2009, the song was re-recorded by 14 members of the original choir. It was released in the UK in November 2009 as part of food company Innocent Drinks' "Big Knit" campaign, to raise money for Age Concern.

The song was covered by Leilah and Jeordie (daughters of Melanie Safka) in 1981, and this version charted on the Canadian singles chart at No. 27 in January 1982.

References

1980 songs
1980 singles
UK Singles Chart number-one singles
Songs about old age
Christmas number-one singles in the United Kingdom
Music for Pleasure (record label) singles